The Party of Reform and Development (PRD) (Arabic: حزب الاصلاح والتنمية Hizb Al-Islah Wal-Tanmiyah) is a political party in Libya, that was founded on 10 January 2012 in Benghazi. It is an Islamist party, promoting the principles of Sharia law. It is led by Khaled al-Werchefani, a former member of the Muslim Brotherhood.

References

2012 establishments in Libya
Islamic political parties in Libya
Islamism in Libya
Political parties established in 2012
Political parties in Libya